Deputy is an American procedural drama television series created by Will Beall. The project started development in October 2018. Fox made a put pilot commitment in January 2019 and then ordered the series May 2019. The series premiered on January 2, 2020 and consisted of thirteen episodes. In April 2020, Fox canceled the series after one season.

Cast

Main

 Stephen Dorff as Deputy Sergeant/Sheriff Bill Hollister, who assumes the mantle of Los Angeles County Sheriff after his predecessor dies of a heart attack. With a reputation for playing by his own rules and defying the system, Bill intends to restore what he believes is a lost sense of honor and duty among his officers.
  Yara Martinez as Dr. Paula Reyes, Bill's supportive wife and a trauma surgeon.
 Brian Van Holt as Deputy Cade Ward, a former Marine-turned-sheriff's deputy who overcame a difficult childhood as a foster child.
 Bex Taylor-Klaus as Deputy (later Detective) Brianna Bishop, a seasoned investigator in the Sheriff's office assigned to Bill's personal security detail when he becomes sheriff. Despite their reservations about his unorthodox style of leadership, they view him as the best chance to reform the department.
 Siena Goines as Deputy Rachel Delgado, Ward's partner who leaves active duty after being shot during a raid. 
 Shane Paul McGhie as Deputy Joseph Harris, a rookie deputy, Bill's god son, and the son of Bill's late partner who joins the department in part to honor his father's sacrifice.
 Mark Moses as Undersheriff Jerry London, Bill's second-in-command. He views his new boss with contempt, given his refusal to follow police procedure or respect the rules of the bureaucracy.
 Danielle Moné Truitt as Deputy Charlie Minnick, a seasoned deputy who was in a secret relationship with her superior, Deputy Gabriel Luna, until his death. She later becomes Harris's second training officer, replacing Luna.

Recurring

 Natalia Cigliuti as Teresa Ward, a lawyer and Cade's wife.
 Valeria Jauregui as Maggie Hollister, Bill and Paula's teenage daughter.
 Danny Soto as Bobby Perez
 Gianna Gallegos as Camilla 
 Sarah Minnich as Deputy Sara Book 
 Josh Helman as Deputy Carter, a friend of Harris who encourages him to loosen up.
 Jenny Gago as Anjelica Reyes, Paula's mother and Maggie's grandmother
 Jaime Ray Newman as Carol Riley, a DA who becomes a candidate for sheriff. She begins an investigation into Bill's involvement in the Johnson case, learning the names of several CI's that one of her aids leaks. London forces her to resign as DA and end her campaign for sheriff, on the threat that he will reveal that her recklessness led to several good people being killed.
Michael Harney as William Hollister Sr. Bills father, a widower and retired LASD deputy. Its implied he suffers from dementia.

Guest

Bobby Naderi as Deputy Gabriel Luna, a training officer who oversees the department's new class of deputies. He was in a relationship with Minnick, and was Harris's initial training officer until he was killed in a convenience store shooting.
Karrueche Tran as Genevieve, Bishop's girlfriend.
Jason Wiles as David Browder, an inmate dying from cancer.
Meg Smith as Taylor, Maggie's friend.
Lex Lotito as Suki, Maggie's other friend.

Episodes

Production

Development
On February 5, 2019, it was announced that Fox had given the production a pilot order. The pilot was written by Will Beall and David Ayer who executive produces, along with Chris Long and Barry Schindel. Production companies involved with the pilot include Entertainment One and Fox Entertainment.

On May 9, 2019, it was announced that Fox had given the series order. A few days later, it was announced that the series would premiere as a mid-season replacement in the spring of 2020. On April 3, 2020, the series was canceled after one season.

Casting
In March 2019, it was announced that Stephen Dorff had joined the cast in the leading role, along with Yara Martinez, Brian Van Holt, Siena Goines, Bex Taylor-Klaus, Shane Paul McGhie and Mark Moses. In October 2019, it was announced that Karrueche Tran had joined the cast in a recurring role playing Genevieve.
On January 28, 2020, Jenny Gago was cast in a recurring capacity.

Release

Marketing
On May 13, 2019, Fox released the first official trailer for the series. On October 22, Fox released a preview clip confirming a January premiere.

Reception

Critical response
On Rotten Tomatoes, the series holds an approval rating of 40% with an average rating of 5.8/10, based on 15 reviews. The website's critical consensus reads, "While those looking for a stylish new procedural with a few unexpected nuances will find much to like, Deputy sticks too closely to its genre guns to break any new ground." On Metacritic, it has a weighted average score of 51 out of 100, based on 10 critics, indicating "mixed or average reviews".

Rating

References

External links

2020 American television series debuts
2020 American television series endings
2020s American crime drama television series
2020s American LGBT-related drama television series
2020s American police procedural television series
Lesbian-related television shows
Television shows set in Los Angeles County, California
Television series by Entertainment One
Television series by Fox Entertainment
Fox Broadcasting Company original programming